Xiangcheng District  , or Sin Kang District in Min Nan, is a district of  Zhangzhou, Fujian province, People's Republic of China.

Location
Xiangcheng is surrounded by the Chuan Chiam Boey Mountains in the south, a bay in the north, the Khor Chu Village in the east, and the Hui Chor Village in the west, where the clan village residents with the surname Qiū are the majority.

Xiangcheng was developed as a clan village with specific surnames for more than 600 years since the Ming Dynasty, with various small communities settled within the clan were formed. Clusters of houses with red-tiled roofs scatter among the labyrinthine alleys, and westward, in the near mid-west of the village, the main street runs from north to south. In the middle part of it stands the marketplace.

The village has thirteen ancestral halls of different sizes, each representing a branch of the Qiu clan. There are two main temples in the village, namely the Cheng Soon Keong and the Hock Leng Keong. The former enshrines Ong Soon Yah and Tua Sai Yah, the patron saints of the Qiu clan, while the latter houses Poh Seh Tai Tay(), the God of Medicine.

Administrative divisions
Subdistricts:
Dongputou Subdistrict, Xiqiao Subdistrict, Xinqiao Subdistrict, Xiangkou Subdistrict, Nankeng Subdistrict, Tongbei Subdistrict

Towns:
Punan, Tianbao, Zhishan, Shiting

Other: Jinfeng Economic Development Zone

Landmarks 
The original Cheng Soon Keong temple collapsed due to lack of maintenance during the Cultural Revolution (1966~1976).  The present building was rebuilt in 1997 with a donation of US$0.84 million from Leong San Tong Khoo Kongsi, Penang. Situated at the downstream of Jiulong River, Xiangcheng was near the trading ports of Southern China from where people of Southern Fujian went overseas during the Ming and Qing Dynasties.

Yuegang was then superseded by Amoy during the Qing dynasty.

References 

 Fujian

County-level divisions of Fujian
Zhangzhou